Figure skating at the 1976 Winter Olympics took place at the Olympiahalle in Innsbruck, Austria. Ice dance was introduced for the first time as an Olympic event at these Games.

Medal table

Results

Men

Referee:
  Sonia Bianchetti

Assistant Referee:
  Emil Skákala

Judges:
  Suzanne Francis
  Ferenc Kertész
  Geoffrey S. Yates
  Milon Duchon
  Ramona McIntyre
  Monique Petis
  Tsukasa Kimura
  Mikhail Drei
  Walburga Grimm
  Franz Heinlein (substitute)

Ladies

Referee:
  Donald H. Gilchrist

Assistant Referee:
  Benjamin T. Wright

Judges:
  Irina Absaliamova
  Yvonne S. McGowan
  Helga von Wiecki
  Toshio Suzuki
  Elsbeth Bon
  Gerhardt Bubník
  Ralph S. McCreath
  Eva von Gamm
  Giorgio Siniscalco
  Walter Hüttner (substitute)

Pairs

Referee:
  Oskar Madl

Assistant Referee:
  Elemér Terták

Judges:
  Valentin Piseev
  Walter Hüttner
  Vera Spurná
  Ralph S. McCreath
  Jürg Wilhelm
  Pamela Davis
  Eugen Romminger
  Jane Vaughn Sullivan
  Walburga Grimm
  Monique Georgelin (substitute)

Ice dance

Referee:
  Hans Kutschera

Assistant Referee:
  Lawrence Demmy

Judges:
  Edith Shoemaker
  Cia Bordogna
  Irina Absaliamova
  Pamela Davis
  Maria Zuchowicz
  Pál Vásárhelyi
  Rudolf Zorn
  Vera Spurná
  Dorothy Leamen
  Jürg Wilhelm (substitute)

Participating NOCs
Seventeen nations participated in figure skating at the 1976 Winter Olympic Games.

References

External links
 Official Olympic Report
 results

 
1976 Winter Olympics events
1976
1976 in figure skating
International figure skating competitions hosted by Austria